Marc Cohen is an American radio personality who has spent over 30 years as a prominent Southern California announcer.  He has performed on both television and radio and has a long running technology show, which is not only well respected, it is one of the most listened to shows on technology in the country.  He has made many keynote speeches at technology conferences and he is called upon by the top technology companies like Microsoft, Sony and Gateway, Inc. to do early technology testing. In addition,
he has been a judge for the Codie award judging the top software in the country.

Personal 

Marc Cohen lives in the San Fernando Valley and graduated from Cal State Northridge.  He is married to Leslie. His daughter Allison is a psychotherapist and his son Darryl is a Managing Director at a leading financial institution.  Marc was formerly President of the Starlight Starbright Children's Foundation and a current board member of NAAAA, the National Association of African American Athletes .

Career Notes 

Marc's show airs weekly on www.computerandtechnologyradio.com with co-host Marsha Collier author of eBay for Dummies.
Marc Cohen was the host of the KABC (AM) Computer and Technology Show from 1998 to 2008 after hosting a regular technology segment on the KABC Morning Show 
Marc and Marsha were heard on KTRB860 in the San Francisco Bay Area from 2009 until sometime before the station went into receivership.
Marc is a Managing Director at a leading Financial Institution in Westlake Village California
Marc's reviews of computer software and hardware are often quoted by technology companies worldwide.
Until KABC and Marc Cohen split, Marc's computer and technology show was the longest-running radio technology show on a single station in Los Angeles, he started his show on KABC in 1998
Marc was a sportscaster and newsman on Boss Radio KHJ and has been a featured reporter on KCAL-TV News as their technology expert.
He is a  host of the Distinguished Speakers Series in Los Angeles and has hosted many international celebrities including Joe Biden Bill Clinton, Tony Blair Mikhail Gorbachev, Ariel Sharon, Senator John Glenn and Bob Woodward.

External links

http://www.kabc.com
https://web.archive.org/web/20111030210405/http://wsradio.com/radio_showspage.aspx?id=10 @realmarccohen
http://www.computerandtechnologyradio.com

References 

American radio personalities
Living people
California State University, Northridge alumni
Place of birth missing (living people)
Year of birth missing (living people)
People from the San Fernando Valley